Enzootic is the non-human equivalent of endemic and means, in a broad sense, "belonging to" or "native to", "characteristic of", or "prevalent in" a particular geography, race, field, area, or environment; native to an area or scope.

It also has two specific meanings:

 an organism being "enzootic" means native to a place or a specific fauna
 in epizoology, an infection is said to be "enzootic" in a population when the infection is maintained in the population without the need for external inputs (cf. Endemic).

See also
Epizootic

Biodiversity